was a  after Kennin and before Ken'ei. This period spanned the years from February 1204 through April 1206.

Change of era
 1204 : The new era name was created to mark an event or a number of events. The previous era ended and a new one commenced in Kennin 4, on the 20th day of the 2nd month of 1204.

Events of the Genkyū era
 1204 (Genkyū 1, 10th month): Minamoto no Sanetomo ordered Hōjō Masanori, Hōjō Tomomichi and Hatakeyama Shigeyasu to travel to Heian-kyō. These three were charged with escorting the daughter of  dainagon Fujiwara-no Noboukiyo to Kamakura where she would marry Sanetomo.
 1204 (Genkyū 1, 12th month): Two of Sanetomo's emissaries returned to Kanto with his bride-to-be; but Shigeyasu remained in Heian-kyo where he died.
 1205 (Genkyū 2, 3rd month): Kyoto and the provinces of the Kinai were devastated by a terrible storm; and at the time, the disaster was deemed to have been caused by the Buddhist priest Eisai after he brought the Zen school of Buddhism to the capital. Eisai was chased out of Kyoto, but in time, he was permitted to return.

References

Sources
 Brown, Delmer and Ichiro Ishida. (1979). The Future and the Past: a translation and study of the 'Gukanshō', an interpretative history of Japan written in 1219. Berkeley: University of California Press. ;  OCLC 5145872
 Kitagawa, Hiroshi and Bruce T. Tsuchida, eds. (1975). The Tale of the Heike. Tokyo: University of Tokyo Press. 	; ; ; ;  OCLC 193064639
 Nussbaum, Louis-Frédéric and Käthe Roth. (2005).  Japan encyclopedia. Cambridge: Harvard University Press. ;  OCLC 58053128
 Titsingh, Isaac. (1834). Nihon Ōdai Ichiran; ou,  Annales des empereurs du Japon.  Paris: Royal Asiatic Society, Oriental Translation Fund of Great Britain and Ireland. OCLC 5850691
 Varley, H. Paul. (1980). A Chronicle of Gods and Sovereigns: Jinnō Shōtōki of Kitabatake Chikafusa. New York: Columbia University Press. ;  OCLC 6042764

External links 
 National Diet Library, "The Japanese Calendar" -- historical overview plus illustrative images from library's collection

Japanese eras
1200s in Japan